Irene Stefani (22 August 1891 – 31 October 1930), born Aurelia Mercede Stefani, was a Roman Catholic Italian nun and a member of the Consolata Missionary Sisters. She assumed the name "Irene" upon entrance into that order and she became a missionary in Kenya.

She was cleared for beatification in 2014 after a miracle found to have been attributed to her intercession was ratified, and she was beatified on 23 May 2019 in Nyeri by Cardinal Polycarp Pengo on behalf of Pope Francis.

Biography
Stefani was born in 1891 in the small village of Anfo as one of twelve children and was baptized in the name of "Aurelia Jacoba Mercede" on the following 23 August. Her mother died on 12 May 1907 and this left Stefani in the delicate position of the management of her siblings and assisting her father, especially in the Christian formation of her younger sisters Marietta and Antonietta, and her brother Ugo who died not long after this. She received Confirmation on 6 November 1898 and later received her First Communion a few years following this.

Stefani joined the Consolata Missionary Sisters in June 1911 and became a professed member of that order on 29 January 1914 prior to the beginning of World War I. Upon entering the order, she took the name of "Irene". That same year, she was sent by Giuseppe Allamano to go to Kenya, leaving on 28 December 1914, where she arrived in January 1915.

Stefani served as a nurse in Kenya and became well known and well regarded among the people that she served. This earned her the nickname "Nyaatha" (Nyina wa tha), which is a name literally translated as "mother of mercy". With the onslaught of World War I, she served in hospitals to tend to the wounded soldiers and those others wounded in the conflict. On 20 August 1916, she was appointed as a Red Cross to assist the Carriers who were forced to march exhaustingly in the African terrain. During this time, she worked in military hospitals in places such as Lindi and Dar es Salaam in Tanzania.

At the conclusion of the war in 1918, Stefani returned to Nyeri where she first served as an assistant formator of the first aspirants of the incipient local congregation known as the Mary Immaculate Sisters. Two years later, she was appointed to Our Lady of Divine Providence mission at Gikondi, remaining there until her death. There, she taught in schools and instructed parishioners in catechism while visiting the villages. At Gikhondi, she was the Superior of the Consolata Missionary Sisters for eight years.

In 1930, Stefani contracted a disease from one of the patients she was treating and grew physically weak in the summer, losing a considerable amount of weight, bearing this as God's will. On 20 October, she felt sick yet opted to visit a plague-stricken person, remaining at his bedside for several hours. She succumbed eleven days later, on 31 October 1930.

Beatification
The cause of beatification commenced on 22 July 1985 under Pope John Paul II and Stefani was declared a Servant of God; this acted as the formal beginning of the cause and it saw the accumulation of documents and testimonies in order to support the cause.
 
On 2 April 2011, Pope Benedict XVI declared her to have lived a life of heroic virtue and declared her to be Venerable.

On 12 June 2014, Pope Francis approved a decree that recognized a miracle attributed to Stefani's intercession which cleared the way for her beatification. It was celebrated by Cardinal Polycarp Pengo on 23 May 2015 in Nyeri.

References

External links
Hagiography Circle
Saints SQPN
Sister Irene Stefani – Servant of God

1891 births
1930 deaths
Italian Roman Catholic missionaries
Beatifications by Pope Francis
19th-century venerated Christians
20th-century venerated Christians
Religious leaders from the Province of Brescia
Italian beatified people
Venerated Catholics by Pope Benedict XVI
Roman Catholic missionaries in Kenya
Roman Catholic missionaries in Tanzania
Roman Catholic medical missionaries
Italian expatriates in Kenya
Italian expatriates in Tanzania